Pierluigi Cera (born 25 February 1941) is a former Italian footballer who played as a midfielder or as a defender, most notably for Cagliari, and the Italy national football team.

Club career
Cera was born in Legnago. During his club career, he played for Verona (1957–64), Cagliari (1964–73), and Cesena (1973–79). He made his Serie A debut with Verona, in a 2–0 away defeat to Milan on 4 May 1958. He later captained Cagliari to the Serie A title in 1970, the first and only league title in the club's history.

International career
At international level, Cera earned 18 caps for the Italy national football team between 1969 and 1972; he made his debut on 22 November 1969, in a 3–0 win over East Germany in a World Cup qualifier, and subsequently played in the 1970 FIFA World Cup, including the final against Brazil, in which Italy finished in second place following a 4–1 defeat.

Style of play
A versatile player, Cera was capable of playing both as a midfield playmaker, and also as a defender. He occupied the role of a Libero or sweeper in his later career, due to his vision, passing, creativity, and ability to bring the ball out from the back, as well as his consistent defensive attributes, which made him, alongside Franz Beckenbauer, one of the first offensive sweepers of his time.

Honours

Club
Cagliari
 Serie A: 1969–70

International
Italy
 FIFA World Cup (Runner-up): 1970

Individual
 Cagliari Greatest XI of all-time

References

1941 births
Living people
Association football midfielders
Association football defenders
Italian footballers
Italy international footballers
1970 FIFA World Cup players
Hellas Verona F.C. players
Cagliari Calcio players
A.C. Cesena players
People from Legnano
Footballers from Lombardy
Sportspeople from the Metropolitan City of Milan